Anarsia eburnella is a moth in the family Gelechiidae. It was described by Hugo Theodor Christoph in 1887. It is found in Turkmenistan, Iran and Afghanistan.

The length of the forewings is about 8 mm. The forewings are bone yellow and the hindwings are light grey.

References

eburnella
Moths described in 1887
Moths of Asia